Legislative elections were held in New Caledonia on 9 July 1967. The result was a victory for the Caledonian Union, which won 22 of the 35 seats.

Campaign
A total of 174 candidates contested the 35 seats. The New Caledonian branch of the Union for the New Republic (led by Georges Chatenay) called for more autonomy and for a second smelting company to be introduced to the territory to create competition for Société Le Nickel.

Results
The three minor party Assembly members were sympathetic to the Caledonian Union.

Elected members

Aftermath
Following the elections, Entente leader Henri Lafleur submitted a petition to annul the results. The petition was rejected on 28 August. He appealed on 4 November. Rock Pidjot also filed a complaint about the election in East constituency, where Caledonian Union candidate and High Chief Goa Alphonse (who was expected to be elected) lost after a fortune teller told his tribe that the chief would die if elected. The complaint was rejected.

André Vacher resigned from the Assembly on 8 August 1967 and was replaced by Charles Attiti. Paul Malignon resigned on 14 June 1970 and was replaced by Marcel Dubois. Jean Caba died on 8 September 1970 and was replaced by Kecine Léonard Une. Lafleur resigned on 20 November 1971 and was replaced by Lionel Cherrier. Edouard Pentecost died on 5 October 1971 and was replaced by Michel Kauma.

References

New Caledonia
Elections in New Caledonia
1967 in New Caledonia
New Caledonia
Election and referendum articles with incomplete results